The Landworkers' Alliance are a UK-based union of farmers, growers, foresters and land-based workers founded in 2015 who work together to campaign for better food and land-use systems.

They also work internationally on topics such as food sovereignty through membership of Via Campesina, the International Peasant’s Movement, which represents over 200 million peasants, farmers and land-based workers through 182 member organisations.

They launched a manifesto for tacking rural inequality at the Oxford Real Farming Conference in 2016, and are twinned to US based Farm Hack to bring their model of supporting new farmers to the UK.

See also 
 Agroecology
 Permaculture

References

External links
 

2015 establishments in the United Kingdom
Agricultural organizations based in Europe
Anti-globalization organizations
Food sovereignty
Land rights movements
Workers' rights organizations